Robert Alexander Gould (born September 2, 1957) is a Canadian former professional ice hockey player. He played eleven seasons in the National Hockey League between 1980 and 1990 with the Atlanta Flames, Calgary Flames, Washington Capitals, and Boston Bruins.

Playing career
Bob Gould was drafted by the Atlanta Flames of the National Hockey League in the seventh round, 118th overall, of the 1977 NHL amateur draft. He was also drafted by the Calgary Cowboys of the World Hockey Association in the eighth round, 70th overall, of the 1977 WHA Amateur Draft. Gould never played in the WHA, although he did eventually play in Calgary; after one game for the Atlanta Flames in 1979–80 he relocated to Calgary with the team the following season. He played parts of the next two seasons, 1980–81 and 1981–82, for the Calgary Flames before being traded to the Washington Capitals on 25 November 1981 along with Randy Holt for Pat Ribble and a second round selection from the 1983 NHL Entry Draft.

After three seasons of bouncing between the minors and the NHL, Gould finally got a chance to play full-time at the NHL level with the Capitals and made the most of it, scoring 18 goals and 31 points in his first 60 games. He continued to play well with three straight seasons with over 20 goals, peaking in 1986–87 with a career-high 23 goals and 50 points.

Gould is also remembered for a March 20, 1987 fight with Mario Lemieux. Giving up 6 inches and 25 lbs, Gould ended up breaking Lemieux's jaw with a solid right uppercut.  Lemieux spent the night at George Washington University Hospital. "The first thing that came to mind when he said, 'Let's go,' was that I could get him off the ice for five minutes," Gould said. "I never thought about hurting him." Lemieux would not fight again in the NHL for another 9 years.

Nearing the end of his career, Gould was traded by the Capitals to the Boston Bruins for defenseman Alain Cote on 28 September 1989. This was Gould's final NHL season, and he helped the Bruins reach the Stanley Cup finals, including advancing past his former team, the Capitals. Gould played for the Maine Mariners of the American Hockey League in 1990–91 before retiring altogether.

In 697 NHL games, he finished with 145 goals and 159 assists.

Career statistics

Regular season and playoffs

Awards and honors

References

External links
 

1957 births
Living people
Atlanta Flames draft picks
Atlanta Flames players
Birmingham Bulls (CHL) players
Boston Bruins players
Calgary Cowboys draft picks
Calgary Flames players
Canadian expatriate ice hockey players in the United States
Canadian ice hockey forwards
Fort Worth Texans players
Ice hockey people from Ontario
Maine Mariners players
New Hampshire Wildcats men's ice hockey players
Oklahoma City Stars players
Tulsa Oilers (1964–1984) players
Washington Capitals players